Acrolophus catagnampta is a moth of the family Acrolophidae. It is found in Brazil.

References

catagnampta
Moths described in 1930